is a railway station in the city of Takasaki, Gunma, Japan, operated by the East Japan Railway Company (JR East), with a freight depot operated by the Japan Freight Railway Company (JR Freight).

Lines
The station is also used by trains of the Shōnan–Shinjuku Line operating on the same tracks.

Station layout
The station consists of one side platform and one island platform connected to the station building by a footbridge; however, platform 2 is fenced off and not used. The station has a Midori no Madoguchi ticket office.

Platforms

History
Shinmachi Station opened on 27 December 1883. Upon the privatization of the Japanese National Railways (JNR) on 1 April 1987, it came under the control of JR East.

Passenger statistics
In fiscal 2019, the station was used by an average of 3728 passengers daily (boarding passengers only).

Surrounding area
 
 Shinmachi Post Office
 Former Shinmachi Town Hall

Bus routes
Nippon Chuo Bus Okutano Line
For Uenomura Fureaikan via Kodama Station and Kanna Village Office

See also
 List of railway stations in Japan

References

External links

  Station information (JR East) 

Takasaki Line
Stations of Japan Freight Railway Company
Railway stations in Gunma Prefecture
Railway stations in Japan opened in 1883
Takasaki, Gunma